is a passenger railway station located in Kōhoku-ku, Yokohama, Kanagawa Prefecture, Japan, operated by the private railway company Tokyu Corporation.

Lines

Station layout 
The station consists of two elevated opposed side platforms, with the station building underneath. These platforms can only accommodate eight-car train lengths.

Platforms

History
It was renamed to its present name on March 31, 1932.

Even though the section between Shin-yokohama and Shin-tsunashima stations of the Tōkyū Shin-Yokohama Line is right underneath this Station, in a 2008 meeting with the local residents, the railway personnel explained that due to geological difficulties it was decided that the Shin-Yokohama Line would not have a dedicated station serving Ōkurayama.

Passenger statistics
In fiscal 2019, the station was used by an average of 55,464 passengers daily. 

The passenger figures for previous years are as shown below.

Surrounding area
 Kōhoku Ward Office
 Okurayama Park

See also
 List of railway stations in Japan

References

External links

 

Railway stations in Kanagawa Prefecture
Railway stations in Japan opened in 1926
Tokyu Toyoko Line
Stations of Tokyu Corporation
Railway stations in Yokohama